Tattoo is a 1981 erotic thriller film directed by Bob Brooks and starring Bruce Dern and Maud Adams. It depicts the relationship between a fashion model and an eccentric tattoo artist that quickly turns sinister.

Plot
Tattoo artist Karl Kinsky (Dern) is approached to work with renowned photographer Halsey (Leonard Frey) on temporary tattoos for swimsuit models. Despite his misgivings, Kinsky agrees to participate after seeing photographs of one of the models, Maddy (Adams).

Maddy arrives late to the photoshoot, but the two quickly bond when she expresses admiration for Kinsky's arm tattoos and recognizes their Japanese influence. After the shoot, Kinsky jealously eavesdrops on Maddy and her flirtatious boyfriend, jazz musician Buddy (John Getz). Maddy complains of having had to "dope" herself to sleep because of Buddy's odd hours. Maddy invites Kinsky to dinner, where he awkwardly asserts his dominance towards the maître d′, and then threatens to kill Maddy's ex-boyfriend Albert (Sam Schacht) for using profanity and drunkenly flirting with Maddy. They quickly leave the restaurant and drive to Maddy's apartment. She invites him in, but he declines, saying he has to catch the last train home. Instead, he goes to a sex show and aggressively speaks to a peep show girl.

The next day, Kinsky surprises Maddy in Central Park with flowers. After confronting her over her use of sleeping pills, he invites her to dine with him at his apartment. She admires his tattoo equipment and artwork. Kinsky explains his theory that women who get tattoos, which he calls "the mark", do so out of a desire to belong. The two go upstairs to dine, and listen to Buddy's music. Kinsky tells Maddy she deserves better than Buddy, citing his handsiness. Maddy calls him "old-fashioned", but begins to makes a pass at him. Kinsky turns her down, citing a need for commitment. Maddy tells him, "People don't make commitments when they fuck anymore" and Kinsky snaps at her over her use of profanity. He kicks her out but follows her to the street, insisting that they see each other again. She agrees to meet him at a Japanese art exhibition at the Met before speeding off in a taxi. The same night, Kinsky repeatedly telephones and berates Maddy from a telephone booth. When she asks him to stop, he returns to his apartment and intently watches her modeling tape.

On the day of the exhibition, Maddy sends her friend Sandra (Rikke Borge) to tell Kinsky that Maddy is out of town, and to ask him to return her modeling tapes. He visits Maddy's apartment, where he is told the same thing by Buddy. He leaves an ominous message on her answering machine, before returning to his family's home to show it to prospective buyers, only to announce that it is not for sale.

Back in Maddy's apartment, she kicks Buddy and his jazz band out for keeping her awake. As she is cleaning up, the doorbell rings. When she answers the door, Kinsky incapacitates her with a chloroform-soaked rag. The next morning she awakens and discovers her chest, shoulders and back have been tattooed with floral patterns. She screams at Kinsky and smashes a mirror once she realizes she has become a hostage. Once Kinsky tells her he is not finished tattooing her, she faints. The next day, the tattoos have been partially colored in. Maddy makes a failed escape attempt, after which Kinsky has her call Buddy at knifepoint to tell him she will not be coming home. Recognizing Kinsky's increasing violence, Maddy agrees to "wear the mark" in exchange for her safety.

Nearly finished with the tattoo, Kinsky stops and has Maddy masturbate while he watches from another room, much like the peep show he visited earlier. Kinsky orgasms just as she begins weeping. Maddy berates him for not "being a man" and having sexual intercourse with her instead. She finds a shard of glass from the mirror and plans to kill Kinsky with it, but is discovered. She seemingly resigns herself to her fate as Kinsky continues to expand the tattoos over her entire body.

Maddy is shocked when Kinsky finally announces, "It's all finished." He disrobes them both and begins to rape her. Maddy is able to grasp the tattoo gun and plunges it into Kinsky's back. As Kinsky dies, Maddy sits up, his limp body draped across her lap. She strokes his hair as she stares off into the distance.

Cast
Bruce Dern as Karl Kinsky
Maud Adams as Maddy
Leonard Frey as Halsey
Rikke Borge as Sandra
John Getz as Buddy
Peter Iacangelo as Dubin
Alan Leach as Customer
Cynthia Nixon as Cindy
Trish Doolan as Cheryl
Anthony Mannino as George
Lex Monson as Dudley
Patricia Roe as Doris
Jane Hoffman as Teresa
Robert Burr as Ralph
John Snyder as Hawker
Kate McGregor-Stewart as Pregnant Wife

Production and release 
The film was written by Joyce Buñuel, the daughter-in-law of surrealist artist Luis Buñuel, based on a story by director Bob Brooks. It was featured in an April 13, 1980 New York Times article spotlighting films being shot on-location in New York City; the article mistakenly identified Rikke Borge as Dern's love interest.

The tattoo designs seen in the film are credited to Isadore Seltzer, a prolific illustrator and graphic designer known for drawing many Sesame Street Magazine covers.

The film had a contentious post-production and pre-release phase. Producer Joseph E. Levine made edits without informing director Bob Brooks, who wrote an angry letter to Levine accusing him of prioritizing the opinions of "assholes in Los Angeles." Feminist group Women Against Pornography protested the film for allegedly equating violence with love. They defaced the advertisements in the subway, which reportedly delighted Levine, who considered it free publicity. Tellingly, although the release date was announced as November or December 1980 in the NYT article, the film was delayed nearly a year until October 9, 1981.

In 2020, a Blu-ray release was planned by Scream Factory, but after going through two release dates, it was scrapped as they could not find any suitable elements for a new master of the movie.

Soundtrack 
The songs "What's Your Name" and "Shot in the Dark" were written by Barry DeVorzon and Michael Towers, and sung by Euca Burrows. Other instrumental music is heard in the film, but an official soundtrack was not released.

Critical reception 
Tattoo earned a Worst Actor Razzie nomination for Dern, who lost to Klinton Spilsbury for his performance in The Legend of the Lone Ranger.

Film critic Roger Ebert of the Chicago Sun-Times awarded the film two out of four stars. He wrote that he enjoyed the film's first two acts, and singled out Dern's performance as "very good," but thought the film faltered in the triteness of its climax. He wrote,"Tattoo could have been an effective and disturbing movie...[It] opens so promisingly that its crucial scenes are doubly disappointing. Because the film's first hour makes it clear that Tattoo is not intended as just another creepy horror film, the failure of the conclusion is all the more disappointing." New York Times film critic Janet Maslin gave the film a similar review. She praised the two leads, along with Borge and Frey, but wrote that while the film "begins with a bit of style...[it] doesn't take long...to turn predictable and slow."

The film's depiction of stalking has been compared to the much more successful films Taxi Driver and Maniac.

Cultural reception 
In Episode 4 of Series 2 of the BBC sitcom The Royle Family, the film is discussed extensively. The character Denise calls it "absolutely brilliant," and explains the plot to Barbara and Cheryl, who are both fascinated and horrified. Meanwhile, in the living room, Dave is explaining the film to Jim, who questions why the protagonist would want to cover up his victim's breasts rather than look at them. Upon learning that the title of the film is Tattoo, Jim references the Fantasy Island character Tattoo and his catchphrase.

References

External links
 
Full Movie at the Internet Archive

1981 films
American thriller drama films
American horror thriller films
1980s thriller drama films
Films scored by Barry De Vorzon
1980s erotic thriller films
Films about tattooing
20th Century Fox films
1981 drama films
1980s English-language films
1980s American films